is a passenger railway station in located in the city of Iga,  Mie Prefecture, Japan, operated by the private railway operator Iga Railway.

Lines
Kayamachi Station is served by the Iga Line, and is located 5.0 rail kilometers from the starting point of the line at Iga-Ueno Station.

Station layout
The station consists of a single island platform connected to the station building by a level crossing. The platform is short and can only accommodate trains of two cars in length.

Platforms

Adjacent stations

History
Kayamachi Station was opened on July 18, 1922. Through a series of mergers, the Iga Line became part of the Kintetsu network by June 1, 1944, but was spun out as an independent company in October 2007. All freight operations were suspended from October 1, 1973.

Passenger statistics
In fiscal 2019, the station was used by an average of 376 passengers daily (boarding passengers only).

Surrounding area
Mie Prefectural Iga Hakuho High School
Ueno Braille Library

See also
List of railway stations in Japan

References

External links

  

Railway stations in Japan opened in 1922
Railway stations in Mie Prefecture
Iga, Mie